Grassi Advisors & Accountants is an American company that provides tax, accounting, and business advisory services. Grassi has been ranked as the 17th largest Accounting Firm in New York by Crain's New York and the 3rd largest by Long Island Business News. It was also ranked the 67th largest nationwide by INSIDE Public Accounting in 2019. The firm has offices in Manhattan, Long Island, White Plains, New York, and Park Ridge, New Jersey, as well as internationally through its association with Moore North America which is a regional member of Moore Global Network Limited (MGNL). Grassi specializes in professional services for the construction, not-for-profit, architecture & engineering, financial services, private equity, healthcare, manufacturing & distribution, retail, technology, media & telecommunication, transportation, energy & natural resources industries, among others.

Background 
Grassi was founded in 1980. The company offers auditing and accounting, tax planning and preparation, personal financial planning, business operational and financial planning, valuation services, IT and human resources consulting and litigation support services.

References

External links
 Grassi Advisors & Accountants. Official site

American companies established in 1980
1980 establishments in New York (state)